The Supertaça Compal (named after its major sponsor COMPAL) or Supertaça da Lusofonia (in English: SuperCup of the Lusophony) is an annual basketball tournament contested by the champions and cup winner teams from Lusophonic (Portuguese-speaking) countries. The event is jointly organized by the Basketball federations of Angola and Portugal.

The first edition of the tournament was played in 2010 between teams from Portugal and Angola. In 2012, a team from Mozambique was invited to play the tournament.

Participation details

Seasons
2010 Supertaça Compal
2011 Supertaça Compal
2012 Supertaça Compal

Winners by club

Winners by country

External links
Info and all results at Interbasket forums

References

 
International club basketball competitions
Basketball competitions in Portugal
Basketball cup competitions in Angola